The 1987 Forsyth County protests were a series of civil rights demonstrations held in Forsyth County, Georgia, in the United States. The protests consisted of two marches, held one week apart from each other on January 17 and January 24, 1987. The marches and accompanying counterdemonstrations by white supremacists drew national attention to the county. The second march was attended by many prominent civil rights activists and politicians, including both of Georgia's U.S. senators, and attracted about 20,000 marchers, making it one of the largest civil rights demonstrations in United States history.

Afterwards, the county was almost entirely populated by white Americans, and it became a sundown county with a reputation for violence against black people who were visiting or traveling through. Despite sustained growth throughout the 1970s and 1980s, the county remained all-white, and in 1980, the United States Census Bureau reported that only one black person was living in the county, which had a population of over 25,000. In light of this, in 1987, a local resident announced plans for a march to occur on the weekend of Martin Luther King Jr. Day to draw attention to the county's history and continuing problems with race. Hosea Williams, a civil rights activist and politician in Atlanta, joined the project and helped lead a group of about 75 marchers through the county on January 17. However, the march was disrupted by a group of about 400 white supremacists, including members of the Ku Klux Klan, who threw bottles and rocks at the marchers, injuring several, including Williams. After local law enforcement told the organizers they could not guarantee their safety, the march was called off. Eight Klansmen were arrested, though white supremacists considered the counterdemonstration a victory and held a rally at the Forsyth County Courthouse in the county seat of Cumming later that day.

The violence drew national and international attention to the county, and Williams and other civil rights activists announced plans for another march the following weekend on January 24. The march attracted about 20,000 participants, primarily from Atlanta, and included numerous notable politicians and activists, including Senators Sam Nunn and Wyche Fowler, Representative John Lewis, and leaders of the Southern Christian Leadership Conference and the NAACP. While the previous march only had about 75 law enforcement officers present, this march saw the deployment of about 3,000 law enforcement officers, including over 1,000 members of the Georgia National Guard. As with the previous march, white supremacists counter-demonstrated the march, with approximately 1,000 to 1,500 present. However, unlike last time, the march was completed and there were few incidents of violence. In total, about 64 people were arrested, including white supremacists Don Black and David Duke.

The marches resulted in the formation by the county of a bi-racial human relations committee intended to address some of the issues raised by activists. About two weeks after the second march, Oprah Winfrey traveled to Cumming to broadcast an episode of her talk show, interviewing several white residents. Some activists protested the show due to the producers' decisions to not have any African Americans on the show, and Williams and several others were arrested for unlawful assembly. Following the first march, the Southern Poverty Law Center sued several white supremacist organizations and individuals for damages, winning nearly $1 million in a federal case that resulted in the dissolution of one of the groups involved. White supremacist activity continued in the region for some time after the protests, and Duke used the publicity gained from his involvement to revive his political career. Following the marches, the non-white population of Forsyth County increased, and by 2022, black people represented about 4 percent of the population, while about a quarter of the county was made up of Asian or Hispanic Americans.

Background

1912 racial conflict 

For much of the 20th century, the primarily rural county had a long history of poor race relations and a reputation as a hostile place for African Americans. In 1912, an African American man was lynched by white Americans in the county due to allegations regarding the murder and rape of a white woman there. In the aftermath of this event, some white people known as "night riders" waged a months-long terror campaign of whitecapping that resulted in the expulsion of almost all African Americans from the county. Prior to this, approximately 1,000 African Americans had been living there, with the county's total population being around 11,000.

Sundown county 
Following the expulsion, Forsyth developed a reputation as a sundown county, where African Americans were not allowed to be in the county after nightfall. In the 1960s, signs were posted around the county reading, "Nigger–Don't Let the Sun Set on You in Forsyth County", including one on the lawn of the county courthouse. Also during this time, as Lake Lanier (which constituted the eastern border of the county) developed into a popular recreational destination, African American vacationers faced discrimination and threats from locals. In 1968, ten African American boys and their camp counselors were told by local residents to leave the county or they would be forcibly removed, and in 1976 there was a cross burning after an African American man rented a slipway at a nearby marina for his boat. Black truck drivers who traveled to the Tyson Foods chicken processing plant were often escorted by members of the Georgia Bureau of Investigation (GBI), while the early 1980s saw many black people shot in encounters with white people at the lake. Despite a steady growth in population through the 1970s and 1980s, the county was home to almost no African Americans, with the United States Census Bureau reporting that, of the county's 1980 population of 27,958 people, only one was black. By comparison, censuses taken in 1920 and 1960 had shown a black population of 30 and 4, respectively. 1980 also saw the expansion of U.S. Route 19 in the county into a four-lane toll road, significantly decreasing the travel time between Cumming and Atlanta and causing the county to begin to develop into an exurban bedroom community for upper middle class white people who worked in Atlanta.

Proposed march 

By 1987, the county had a population of around 38,000, of which about 99 percent was white, leading several media publications to refer to the county during this time as "all-white". That year, Charles A. Blackburn, a white resident of Cumming announced plans for a civil rights march to draw attention to the county's racial problems. However, Blackburn backed out of the idea after receiving numerous death threats. Dean and Tammy Carter, two residents of Gainesville, Georgia, revived the idea and invited Hosea Williams, a civil rights activist and member of the Atlanta City Council, proposing a "March against Fear and Intimidation" in the county on January 17. The purpose of the march was to draw attention to the history and lasting legacy of the racial events in the county, including highlighting the fact that the county was still all-white. It was scheduled to take place the weekend before Martin Luther King Jr. Day, which had been established as a federal holiday only four years earlier, in 1983, and had quickly become, according to human rights activist and academic Leonard Zeskind, "a flashpoint for white supremacists".

In the weeks leading up to the march, Klan groups and white supremacists in north Georgia began to coordinate plans to disrupt the event, which they said was being organized by "outside agitators and communist racemixers". The planned march was to occur against the backdrop of several high-profile racial incidents across the country, including an attack on three black people in Howard Beach, Queens, and a hazing incident at a military college in South Carolina wherein a black student was harassed by white students who had dressed as Klansmen. Regarding the racial climate at the time, activist and pastor Cecil Williams of the Glide Memorial United Methodist Church in San Francisco said, "Just when we thought we had swept the whirlwind of racism into the corners of society, now we see it is blowing back into the center of the floor". On January 17, the same day that the march in Forsyth County was scheduled, white supremacist groups had held a parade in Pulaski, Tennessee, the birthplace of the Ku Klux Klan, led by white supremacists Robert E. Miles and Thomas Robb.

First march 
The march occurred in Cumming on Saturday, January 17, with a group of about 75 demonstrators, mostly from Atlanta. The group consisted of about two dozen local white people and several African American activists who traveled there by bus. Among those who participated were future author Patrick Phillips and his family, who were locals of the area, and state representative Billy McKinney. The march was planned to begin at Bethel View Road near an offramp of Georgia State Route 400 and go for several miles through the county until ending in Cumming. The demonstrators arrived late, and in the meantime, a group of about 400 counterdemonstrators, composed of Klansmen and individuals sympathetic to white supremacist ideology, had gathered to oppose the civil rights demonstration. Noted white supremacists J. B. Stoner, Daniel Carver, and Dave Holland, who was the grand dragon of a Ku Klux Klan organization, were present and gave speeches that energized the group of counterdemonstrators. During one speech, Stoner stated that allowing African Americans into Forsyth County would bring "crime and AIDS" to the area. Seeking to disrupt the march, these white supremacists gathered at the intersection of two county roads along the march's  route, and some of the people carried Confederate battle flags and nooses. Klansmen constituted about 10 percent of the total number of the counterdemonstrators there and were primarily members of one of two Klan organizations: The Southern White Knights and the Invisible Empire Knights of the Ku Klux Klan.

In preparation for the march, about 75 local police officers and members of the Georgia State Patrol (GSP) were on duty, though both the law enforcement and the demonstrators were greatly outnumbered by the counterdemonstrators, as local officials had not expected their large turnout. As the march began, the large number of counterdemonstrators overwhelmed the police cordons that they had set up along the march's path, and many began to shout racial slurs and other obscenities at the marchers. At one point, Williams led marchers in singing "We Shall Overcome" as the counterdemonstrators chanted racial expletives. The event eventually turned violent as some counterdemonstrators began throwing rocks and bottles at the marchers, resulting in several people becoming injured. Williams was one of the injured, having been hit in the head by a brick. The violence ultimately prompted the march organizers to call off the event prematurely after law enforcement officials told them that they could not guarantee their safety. Law enforcement officials arrested 8 Klansmen, and all but one were residents of Forsyth County. After the march was called off, counterdemonstrators met at the Forsyth County Courthouse and listened to more speeches given by Stoner and other Klansmen. Former pro-segregation governor of Georgia Lester Maddox was also in attendance.

Speaking of the event later, Williams stated, "In thirty years in the civil rights movement, I haven't seen racism any more sick than here today". Talking to The New York Times, Williams compared the county to South Africa under apartheid and said that children as young as 10 or 12 had yelled death threats and racial slurs at the marchers. The march and accompanying violence attracted national attention, and local leaders attempted to mitigate some of the bad publicity, with the chamber of commerce putting full-page advertisements on newspapers stating that the racists' actions did not represent the people of Forsyth County. Many local residents expressed frustration over the attention the march had drawn to their county, with one Forsyth County local telling The Atlanta Constitution, "we should have busted every camera down there and kicked every reporter's ass". In the aftermath of the march, the Mead Corporation cancelled plans they had for constructing a 5,000-worker plant in the county.

Second march 
On January 19, Williams and Dean Carter announced their intention to hold another march in Forsyth County on the following Saturday, January 24. Williams called it a "March for Brotherhood" and said it would be the largest civil rights demonstration since the civil rights movement of the 1960s. This march drew both national and international attention, with The New York Times reporting on it with a front-page story, and saw the participation of about 20,000 demonstrators. The number of demonstrators was four to five times the number of participants that the organizers had expected, and they said that there had been an additional 4,000 people in Atlanta who would have participated but were unable to come to Cumming due to a lack of transportation. In total, about 175 buses provided by the Metropolitan Atlanta Rapid Transit Authority, as well as ten others, were used in getting demonstrators from the King Center for Nonviolent Social Change Atlanta to Cumming. A significant portion of the participants were white, over half appeared to be under the age of 30, and some traveled from distant places such as California, New York, and Nigeria to participate.

The march was scheduled to begin at 11 a.m., but due to the size of the crowd, the start was delayed by over three hours, commencing at about 2:20 p.m. The protestors met at a shopping center on the outskirts of Cumming and began the roughly  march, beginning at an offramp of Georgia 400 at Georgia State Route 20, travelling mostly along Georgia State Route 9, and terminating at the Forsyth County Courthouse in downtown Cumming. Once there, several speeches would be given at the courthouse square. Due again to the large number of people participating, the march took about 2 hours to complete, with some areas having people walk 8-to-12 people abreast. Many notable individuals participated in the march, including numerous politicians and civil rights leaders. Both of the U.S. senators from Georgia, Sam Nunn and Wyche Fowler, marched, along with U.S. Representative John Lewis, a civil rights activist who had participated in the Selma to Montgomery marches. Other politicians included former senator and presidential candidate Gary Hart and Atlanta Mayor Andrew Young, who said of the march, "This march had to take place, for we once again had to say: 'We ain't gonna let nobody turn us round'". Other noted civil rights activists included Southern Christian Leadership Conference president Joseph Lowery, NAACP executive director Benjamin Hooks, A. James Rudin of the American Jewish Committee, Ralph Abernathy, Dick Gregory, Jesse Jackson, and Coretta Scott King, the widow of Martin Luther King Jr.

As with last time, there was a large number of white supremacists who had gathered in Forsyth County, numbering over 1,000. Many of these individuals, which included neo-Nazis from organizations in the surrounding states, participated in a countermarch led by white nationalist lawyer Richard Barrett of Mississippi. Among these individuals was David Duke, a former member of the Ku Klux Klan and the president of the National Association for the Advancement of White People, a white supremacist group. Duke had come to the march at the invitation of Atlanta racial extremist Ed Fields and a local group called the Committee to Keep Forsyth White, and he was joined by fellow former Klansman Don Black and Maddox. According to Duke, he was protesting because, "If blacks moved into Forsyth County, it would mean the death of whites. They would become the victims of murders, assaults, robberies and drug pushers. That’s the reality of integration". Despite the large turnout, leaders from two large Klan organizations, including Holland, ordered their members not to attend, as they thought the march was a plot by the Federal Bureau of Investigation (FBI) to arrest Klansmen.

In addition to the increased number of counterdemonstrators, there was also a significant increase in the number of law enforcement officials present. Approximately 3,000 officers, including around 2,000 members of the Georgia National Guard who were dressed in riot gear, 600 police officers from jurisdictions around the state, 350 GSP troopers, and 185 GBI agents, were present at the demonstration. The FBI coordinated law enforcement efforts with local authorities, and federal law enforcement agents were also present and marched with William Bradford Reynolds, the United States Assistant Attorney General for the Civil Rights Division, who stated that "what started last week will be repeated without violence". Regarding the number of law enforcement officials present, a spokesperson for Georgia Governor Joe Frank Harris stated that it was "the greatest show of force on the part of the state of Georgia in history". 14 counterdemonstrators were arrested before the march began, with 4 of those individuals being identified as Klansmen. In total, about 64 people were arrested either before or during the march. Duke and Black were among those arrested during the march for attempting to block a highway. The counterdemonstrators yelled slurs and expletives at the marchers and, as in the previous march, threw some projectiles that resulted in a few injuries. One man was hit by a cement block and a woman was struck by a steel pipe, but, according to a report by the Los Angeles Times, "the march was not marred by major clashes or injuries". Out of safety concerns, GBI officials at the courthouse square did not allow Fowler, Lewis, or Nunn to cross the street to speak to reporters or allow reporters access to the courthouse square. A spokesperson for the governor stated, "When you consider the size of the crowd, this was a pretty peaceful march". By 6:30 p.m., buses began to transport demonstrators back to Atlanta.

The Oprah Winfrey Show broadcast from Cumming 

On February 9, about two weeks after the second march, television talk show host Oprah Winfrey traveled to Cumming to broadcast an episode of her talk show, The Oprah Winfrey Show. At the time, the show had only been on the air for about five months, and the episode marked the first time that the show was recorded somewhere other than its regular studio. For the episode, Winfrey had an all-white audience of about 100 Forsyth County residents that she talked to about the marches and the county's history of racial issues. During the episode, several locals expressed racist sentiments to Oprah and opined in favor of the county remaining all-white, while others were more sympathetic to the marchers and expressed dismay at the racist attitudes of some of the residents. While Williams had asked to appear on the show, Winfrey and the show's producers declined, stating that they only wanted county residents. This prompted a protest led by Williams outside of the restaurant that the episode was being recorded at. In the aftermath, eight individuals, including Williams, were arrested on charges of unlawful assembly, with Williams also being charged with blocking a state highway. Asked after the episode completed filming how she felt about being in the county, Winfrey, a black woman, stated, "Not very comfortable at all. I’m leaving".

Aftermath

Legacy 
Multiple news sources, such as the Los Angeles Times and The New York Times, and academics have made note of the size of the January 24 march, with many sources referring to it as one of the largest civil rights demonstrations in the history of the Southern United States. According to journalists David Treadwell and Barry Bearak, some activists from the civil rights movement of the 1960s viewed the march as the start of a possible resurrection of the movement, with Williams saying, "The civil rights family has not been together like this since we buried Martin Luther King". Civil rights activist Ozell Sutton, who was a regional director of the United States Department of Justice's office of community relations at that time, also spoke positively about the march, saying, "This outpouring of black and white and all racial groups is an indication of a deep and abiding concern [for civil rights]". Martin Luther King III, the eldest son of Martin Luther King Jr., stated that his father would have seen the march as "a great demonstration of brotherhood and love". Following the protests, Governor Harris organized an investigation into the protests. According to historian Wendy Hamand Venet, his committee finding that the state's flag, which prominently featured a Confederate battle flag as part of its design, "was a factor inciting racism and violence and recommended its removal". The protests ultimately led to a revival over the issue of the state flag, with many prominent politicians and activists calling for the removal of the Confederate symbol from the flag. Following the white supremacist Unite the Right rally in Charlottesville, Virginia, in 2017 that resulted in the death of a counter-protestor in a terrorist attack, several publications made comparisons between the violence there and that witnessed in Forsyth County in 1987.

Changes in Forsyth County 
Following the marches, local leaders in Forsyth County publicly deplored the actions of the Klansmen and offered apologies to the marchers. Additionally, on February 9, they announced the creation of a biracial human relations committee to help address racial issues in the county. The committee included six white county leaders and six African-Americans, with three of the latter being appointed by the six white members and another 2 being appointed by Williams and his colleagues. Forsyth County's population continued to grow over the next several decades, with the 1990 United States census reporting a total population of 49,000. By 2019, this number had increased to approximately 245,000. As the population grew, so too did the number of non-white residents in the county. In 1990, the county had 14 black residents, but by 2019, African Americans constitute 2.6 percent of the population, growing to about 4 percent by 2022. Additionally, by that year, a quarter of the population was made up of either Asian Americans or Hispanic Americans. Throughout this time, the county has played host to several other civil rights protests, including a march in August 1992 in recognition the fifth anniversary of the 1987 marches. This march, which included about 40 people led by Williams, involved about 200 police officers and was counter-demonstrated by about 350 white supremacists, including members of the Nationalist Movement. In June 2020, amidst the George Floyd protests in Georgia, about 1,000 people protested for civil rights and racial justice. The protests were peaceful, and while there were rumors that counterdemonstrators from the Nationalist Movement would disrupt the event, this did not come to fruition.

Impact on white supremacist organizations

Southern Poverty Law Center's lawsuit 
Following the protests, the Southern Poverty Law Center (SPLC), a civil rights legal advocacy organization, filed a lawsuit against 11 Klansmen and two Klan organizations (the Invisible Empire and the Southern White Knights) for damages related to their attack on January 17. In October 1988, a federal jury ordered the organizations and individuals to pay almost $1 million in damages to the marchers. The Invisible Empire was ordered to pay about $800,000 of this judgement. As a result of the ruling, James Farrands, the leader of the Invisible Empire, agreed to relinquish all of the organization's assets, including its name, and personally paid $37,500 to the affected marchers. By the middle of 1993, due to the settlement, the organization was defunct.

Forsyth County v. Nationalist Movement 

The total cost of the law enforcement presence for the second march was over $670,000. Of this amount, the government of Georgia paid $579,148, other governmental agencies paid $29,759, and the county covered the remainder. In light of this, on January 27, 1987, the Forsyth County Board of Commissioners passed an ordinance requiring permits for rallies and demonstrations and requiring the groups holding these events to cover some of the costs associated with law enforcement protections, with a later amendment capping the cost of the daily fees at $1,000.

This came up in January 1989, when the Nationalist Movement made plans to hold a demonstration on the steps of the Forsyth County Courthouse in opposition of Martin Luther King Jr. Day. Following the ordinance, the county charged the group $100 in permit fees. However, rather than pay the fee, the Nationalist Movement sued the county, alleging that the fees violated their freedom of speech under the provisions of the First Amendment to the United States Constitution. The case made its way before the Supreme Court of the United States, with the American Civil Liberties Union writing an amicus brief in favor of the Nationalist Movement. In the end, the Supreme Court decided in favor of the Nationalist Movement, ruling that the county's permit fees system was unconstitutional.

David Duke 
According to reporter Tyler Bridges, Duke's involvement in the protests marked the beginning of his "political comeback". The counterdemonstration marked his first public appearance in five years, and he used the increased media attention to get interviews with many national media publications, causing his national profile to increase among white supremacist circles. Following the protests, Klan and activity in north Georgia increased. During this time, on February 22, 1987, Duke and Barrett held a white supremacist rally near Cumming that attracted about 125 people, and during a March 7, speech before white nationalist Populist Party members, Duke stated that the Forsyth counterdemonstrations marked "the genesis of an entirely new movement" for white nationalism. That year, Duke announced his presidential campaign for the 1988 election, with Bridges stating that, "Forsyth County had reminded leaders of the white supremacist movement that Duke was their best spokesman". Duke held his campaign kickoff event in nearby Marietta, Georgia, and officially announced his candidacy on the steps of the Georgia State Capitol in Atlanta, with the locations chosen at least in part due to their proximity to Forsyth County.

Notes

References

Sources

Further reading

External links 
 
 

1987 crimes in the United States
1987 in Georgia (U.S. state)
1987 protests
African-American history of Georgia (U.S. state)
Civil rights protests in the United States
Events in Georgia (U.S. state)
Forsyth County, Georgia
History of African-American civil rights
January 1987 events in the United States
Ku Klux Klan crimes
Ku Klux Klan in Georgia (U.S. state)
Neo-Nazism in the United States
Oprah Winfrey
Post–civil rights era in African-American history
Protest marches in the United States
Race-related controversies in the United States
Race and crime in the United States
Racially motivated violence against African Americans